Although English is a Germanic language, it has Latin influences. Its grammar and core vocabulary are inherited from Proto-Germanic, but a significant portion of the English vocabulary comes from Romance and Latinate sources. A portion of these borrowings come directly from Latin, or through one of the Romance languages, particularly Anglo-Norman and French, but some also from Italian, Portuguese, and Spanish; or from other languages (such as Gothic, Frankish or Greek) into Latin and then into English. The influence of Latin in English, therefore, is primarily lexical in nature, being confined mainly to words derived from Latin and Greek roots.

Early Middle Ages
The Germanic tribes who later gave rise to the English language  traded and fought with the Latin speaking Roman Empire. Many words  for common objects therefore entered the vocabulary of these Germanic people via Latin even before the tribes reached Britain : anchor, butter, camp, cheese, chest, cook, copper, devil, dish, fork, gem, inch, kitchen, mile, mill, mint (coin), noon, pillow, pound (unit of weight), punt (boat), sack, wall, street, wine.

Christian missionaries coming to Britain in the 6th or and 7th century brought with them Latin religious terms. Some of these words are ultimately of Greek origin, as much of the technical language of Christianity developed from the Greek of the New Testament and the works of those Fathers of the Church who wrote in Greek.

During this time, the Catholic monks mainly wrote or copied text in Latin, the prevalent Medieval Lingua Franca of Europe. However, when monks occasionally wrote in the vernacular, Latin words were translated by finding suitable Old English equivalents. Often, a Germanic word was adopted and given a new shade of meaning in the process. Such was the case with Old English gōdspell ("gospel") for Latin Evangelium. Previously, the Old English word simply meant "good news," but its meaning was extended in Old English to fit a religious context. The same occurred for the Old Germanic pagan word blētsian, which meant "to sacrifice, consecrate by shedding blood". It was adapted by Old English scribes and christened to become the word bless. Similarly fullwiht 
(literally, "full-being") and the verb fullian came to mean "baptism" and "to baptise" respectively, but probably originally referred to some kind of rite of passage.

Whenever a suitable Old English substitute could not be found, a Latin word could be chosen instead, and many Latin words entered the Old English lexicon in this way. Such words include: "biscop" "bishop" from Latin "episcopus", Old English "tepid""carpet" from Latin "tapetum", and Old English "sigel""brooch" from Latin "sigillum""culcer" and "læfel""spoon" from Latin "coclearium"and "labellum" beside Old English "spōn" and hlædel (Modern English ladle); Old English forca from Latin furca "fork" next to Old English gafol; Old English scamol "chair, stool" from Latin scamellum beside native stōl, benc and setl. All told, approximately 600 words were borrowed from Latin during the Old English period. Often, the Latin word was severely restricted in sense, and was not widespread in use among the general populace. Latin words tended to be literary or scholarly terms and were not very common. The majority of them did not survive into the Middle English Period.

Middle Ages
The Norman Conquest of 1066 gave England a two-tiered society with an aristocracy which spoke Anglo-Norman and a lower class which spoke English. From 1066 until Henry IV of England ascended the throne in 1399, the royal court of England spoke a Norman language that became progressively Gallicised through contact with French. However, the Norman rulers made no attempt to suppress the English language, apart from not using it at all in their court. In 1204, the Anglo-Normans lost their continental territories in Normandy and became wholly English. By the time Middle English arose as the dominant language in the late 14th century, the Normans had contributed roughly 10,000 words to English of which 75% remain in use today. Continued use of Latin by the Church and centres of learning brought a steady, though dramatically reduced, influx of new Latin lexical borrowings.

Renaissance

During the English Renaissance, from around 1500–1650, some 10,000 to 12,000 words entered the English lexicon, including the word lexicon. Some examples include aberration, allusion, anachronism, democratic, dexterity, enthusiasm, imaginary, juvenile, pernicious, sophisticated. Many of these words were borrowed directly from Latin, both in its classical and medieval forms. In turn, Late Latin also included borrowings from Greek.

Industrial Age

The dawn of the age of scientific discovery in the 17th and 18th centuries created the need for new words to describe newfound knowledge. Many words were borrowed from Latin, while others were coined from Latin roots, prefixes, and suffixes, and Latin word elements freely combine with elements from all other languages including native Anglo-Saxon words. Some of the words which entered English at this time are: apparatus, aqueous, carnivorous, component, corpuscle, data, experiment, formula, incubate, machinery, mechanics, molecule, nucleus, organic, ratio, structure, vertebra.

Consequences for English
In addition to a large number of historical borrowings and coinages, today Latinate words continue to be coined in English – see classical compounds – particularly in technical contexts. A number of more subtle consequences include: numerous doublets – two or more cognate terms from both a Germanic and Latinate source (or Latinate sources), such as cow/beef; numerous cases of etymologically unrelated terms for closely related concepts, notably Germanic nouns with a Latin adjective, such as bird/avian or hand/manual; complicated etymologies due to indirect borrowings (via Romance) or multiple borrowings; and usage controversies over the perceived complexity of Latinate terms.

Noun/adjective doublets
As with Germanic/Latinate doublets from the Norman period, the use of Latinate words in the sciences gives us pairs with a native Germanic noun and a Latinate adjective:
animals: ant/formic, bee/apian, bird/avian, crow/corvine, cod/gadoid, carp/cyprine, fish/piscine, gull/larine, wasp/vespine, butterfly/papilionaceous, worm/vermian, spider/arachnid, snake/anguine, tortoise (or turtle)/testudinal, cat/feline, rabbit/cunicular, hare/leporine, dog/canine, deer/cervine, reindeer/rangiferine, fox/vulpine, wolf/lupine, goat/caprine, sheep/ovine, swan/cygnean, duck/anatine, starling/sturnine, goose/anserine, ostrich/struthious, horse/equine, chicken/gallinaceous, ox/bovine, pig/porcine, whale/cetacean, ape/simian, bear/ursine, man/human or hominid (gender specific: man/masculine, woman/feminine) these words can also be altered informally by adding "-like" as a suffix to the Germanic prefix.
physiology: head/capital, body/corporal, ear/aural, tooth/dental, tongue/lingual, lips/labial, neck/cervical, finger/digital, hand/manual, arm/brachial, foot/pedal, sole of the foot/plantar, leg/crural, eye/ocular or visual, mouth/oral, chest/pectoral, nipple/papillary, brain/cerebral, mind/mental, nail/ungual, hair/pilar, lung/pulmonary, kidney/renal, blood/sanguine.
astronomy: moon/lunar, sun/solar, earth/terrestrial, star/stellar.
sociology: son or daughter/filial, mother/maternal, father/paternal, brother/fraternal, sister/sororal, wife/uxorial.
other: book/literary, edge/marginal, fire/igneous, water/aquatic, wind/vental, ice/glacial, boat/naval, house/domestic, door/portal, town/urban, sight/visual, tree/arboreal, marsh/paludal, sword/gladiate, king/regal, fighter/military, bell/tintinnabulary, clothes/sartorial.

Thus Latin constitutes a linguistic superstratum for English just as Japanese has a Chinese superstratum and Hindustani has a Persian superstratum.

Indirect influence
It is not always easy to tell at what point a word entered English, or in what form. Some words have come into English from Latin more than once, through French or another Romance language at one time and directly from Latin at another. Thus there are pairs like fragile/frail, army/armada, corona/crown, ratio/reason, and rotund/round. The first word in each pair came directly from Latin, while the second entered English from French (or Spanish, in the case of armada). In addition, some words have entered English twice from French, with the result that they have the same source, but different pronunciations reflecting changing pronunciation in French, for example, chief/chef (the former a Middle English borrowing and the latter modern). Multiple borrowings explain other word pairs and groups with similar roots but different meanings and/or pronunciations: canal/channel, poor/pauper, coy/quiet, disc/disk/dish/desk/dais/discus.

Sociolinguistical consequences
David Corson in The Lexical Bar (1985) defended the thesis that academic English, due to its large portion of Greco-Latinate words, explains the difficulties of working class children in the educational system. When exposed at home mainly to colloquial English (the easier, shorter, Anglo-Saxon words), the differences with children who have more access to academic words (longer, more difficult, Greco-Latinate) tend not to become less by education but worse, impeding their access to academic or social careers. In various experiments and comparative studies Corson measured fewer differences between 12 year olds than 15 year olds due to their unfamiliarity with Greco-Latinate words in English and the way teachers deal with them.
Corson's views were not always represented correctly. In his totally revised Using English Words (1995) the linguistic, historical, psychological and educational aspects have been integrated better.

See also

References
Bryson, Bill. The Mother Tongue: English and How It Got That Way. New York: Avon, 1990.
Corson, David. The Lexical Bar Oxford: Pergamon, 1985.
Corson, David. Using English Words Dordrecht: Kluwer, 1995.
Hughes, Geoffrey. Words in Time. Oxford: Basil Blackwell, 1988.
Kent, Roland G. Language and Philology. New York: Cooper Square, 1963.
McCrum, Robert, William Cran, and Robert MacNeil. The Story of English. New York: Elisabeth Sifton, 1986.

Notes

English language